Pleurotomella eulimenes is a species of sea snail, a marine gastropod mollusk in the family Raphitomidae.

Description
The length of the shell attains 6 mm, its diameter 2 mm.

Distribution
This marine species occurs in the Gulf of Oman.

References

External links
 Melvill J.C. (1904). Descriptions of twelve new species and one variety of marine Gastropoda from the Persian Gulf, Gulf of Oman, and Arabian Sea, collected by Mr. F. W. Townsend, 1902–1904. Journal of Malacology. 11(4): 79-85
 

eulimenes
Gastropods described in 1904